Tyaunna Marshall (born December 22, 1992) is a professional basketball player who currently plays for Indiana Fever in the Women's National Basketball Association. She is known for her rebounding ability as a guard. She played college basketball at Georgia Tech and is the Yellow Jackets women's basketball career leading scorer. Marshall was drafted in the second round of the 2014 WNBA draft by the New York Liberty, but was released before the 2014 WNBA season. On February 10, 2015, Marshall signed with the Indiana Fever. She pursues pro basketball career recently in Hungary, at KSC Szekszárd, after stints in Italy and Romania.

Georgia  Tech statistics
Source

References

External links
Georgia Tech Yellow Jackets bio

1992 births
Living people
American women's basketball players
Basketball players from Maryland
Georgia Tech Yellow Jackets women's basketball players
New York Liberty draft picks
Guards (basketball)